CDLS may refer to:

Cornelia de Lange Syndrome
Democratic Confederation of San Marino Workers (Confederazione Democratica dei Lavoratori Sammarinesi)
Community Development & Leadership Summit